Nicole Zimmermann (born 11 May 1980 in Rostock) is a German rower.

References 
 
 

1980 births
Living people
German female rowers
Rowers from Rostock
Olympic rowers of Germany
Rowers at the 2004 Summer Olympics
Rowers at the 2008 Summer Olympics
World Rowing Championships medalists for Germany
20th-century German women
21st-century German women